Raymond Martin Marie Ghislain, Baron Lemaire (Uccle, 28 May 1921 - Woluwe-Saint-Lambert, 13 August 1997) was an art historian and an architectural historian, a leading expert in conservation and professor at the Catholic University of Leuven and later at the KU Leuven and the Université catholique de Louvain in Louvain-la-Neuve.

Family 
Lemaire was a son of Herman Lemaire (1883-1947), architect in chief of the Belgian Ministry of Public Works, and of Marie-Henriette Winderyckx (*1892). In 1947, he married Christiane Vergaert (1924-2007) and they had four children. He was a nephew of the distinguished art historian, canon and professor Raymond Lemaire (1878–1954), from whom he was distinguished by his middle initial.

On 25 July 1990, he was elevated into the Belgian hereditary nobility, with the personal title of baron. He took as his heraldic device: Virtus scientiam major.

Studies and first activities 
After his secondary studies at the Collège Saint-Pierre in Uccle, he studied at the Catholic University of Louvain, from 1938 till 1942. He graduated in law, history and art history. In 1948, he obtained a doctoral degree in Art History and Archaeology with a dissertation on the origins of Brabantine Gothic, L'Origine du style gothique en Brabant. He worked with the professors Stan Leurs and Anoni (Milan).

Monuments Man
Volunteer after Belgium was liberated, he became captain in the First Armoured Car-regiment (Brigade Piron). From 1946 until 1949, with the title of plenipotentiary minister, he was a member of the Commission searching for stolen works of art. He was a liaison officer between the Belgian government and the allied services, the so-called Monuments Men.

He coordinated the return to Belgium of thousands of looted works of art, books, archives and other items belonging to Belgium or Belgian citizens.

Activities in Belgium 
Lemaire became assistant (1947), lecturer (1949) and professor (1953) at the Catholic University of Louvain. He lectured art history, history of architecture, both in Dutch and in French, and continued to do so after the university had been split in two, along language lines. He retired in 1986.

His main activities were devoted towards architecture, restoration and urban planning.

He became renowned for the restoration of the Grand Béguinage in Leuven, where he put into practice the Venice Charter, of which he was the main editor. He was also one of the main designers of the new town Louvain-la-Neuve. The concept was based on the structure of a historic traditional town.

These were not his only realizations. With regard to restorations, have to be mentioned:
 some thirty churches and chapels,
 a number of houses and country houses.

From 1972 until 1977, he was counsel to the town of Bruges, more specifically for the historic town. Thanks to him, Bruges became one of the Belgian pilot-projects for the European Year of the architectural heritage (1975).

He took also part in other urban projects:
 Rue des Brasseurs in Namur,
 Quartier des Arts in Brussels,
 projects in Courtrai, Mouscron, Villeneuve d'Ascq and Bergen-op-Zoom.

He took also part in projects for new buildings, as designer or counsel, often in collaboration with the architects Robert Vandendael, Daniël Depoorter, Simon Brigode, Marc Dessauvage,
 Auditorium prof. Peeters at the University of Leuven in Heverlee,
 the church of Herne,
 the metro station in Kraainem,
 the church of Brasschaat,
 his own house in Loonbeek.

He was also the initiator of the extensive series of books with the inventory of the Belgian architectural inheritance, along a methodology which he developed. 
In 1997, the order of engineers and architects of Beirut edited the book entitled: ENVIRONNEMENT ET PATRIMOINE. patrimoine et lendemain.

International activities 
Lemaire was one of the main authors of the Venice Charter (1964). He was advisor to the European Union, the Council of Europe, and UNESCO.
 
With Piero Gazzola he founded in 1965 ICOMOS, the International Council for Monuments and Sites, an NGO linked with UNESCO. Lemaire was secretary-general (1965-1975) and president (1975-1981) of the organization. He founded the ICOMOS-periodical under the name Monumentum.

He attained international recognition thanks to his activities as an expert and counsellor for important restorations and numerous renovations. This was the case for his activities regarding:
 the temples of Borobodur (Indonesia),
 the Acropolis in Athens,
 the Pisa tower,
 churches in Romania,
 historic town on Malta,
 the sites of Jerash and Petra in Jordan,
 the Kasbah of Algiers.

He was also the special envoy of the director general of UNESCO (1971-1997) regarding the extremely difficult question of the historic Jerusalem.

In 1976, he founded within the College of Europe in Bruges a postgraduate center for the conservation of monuments and sites. After five years, as a consequence of financial problems, the center moved to Leuven. Once he had died the Center was named after him.

Honours 
 1977: Raymond Lemaire was named honorary doctor at the Faculté polytechnique de Mons,
 1978: the Award Sir Abercrombie (Union Internationale des Architectes),
 1970: the Gold Medal of the Académie d'Architecture de France,
 1983: the Gold medal for the Conservation and restoration of monuments (Hamburg).

Sources
Most archives of Lemaire's office, including numerous architectural drawings, are kept in the Central Library of the University of Leuven, while his slides are kept in the RLICC.

Publications 
 Les origines du style gothique en Brabant, 2/1. La formation du style gothique brabançon. Les églises de l'ancien quartier de Louvain, Antwerp, 1949.
 "Bouwkunst", in Gids voor de Kunst in België, Utrecht/Antwerpen, 1963.
 Centre for the conservation of historic towns and buildings, Brugge, 1978.
 Stable – Unstable? Structural consolidation of ancient buildings, Louvain, 1988.
 Raymond Lemaire, ICOMOS - un regard en arrière, un coup d'oeil en avant (Dossier de la Commission royale des monuments, sites et fouilles, 5), Liège, 1999, 195 p. .

Literature 
 Derek LINSTRUM, The World of Conservation: An Interview with Raymond Lemaire, in: Monumentum, vol. xxvi, no 2, 1983.
 Hommage au professeur Raymond Lemaire - Hulde aan professor Raymond Lemaire, special edition of ICOMOS Belgium, Leuven, 1998.
 Michel WOITRIN, Raymond Lemaire, in: Nouvelle Biographie nationale, vol. 7, 2003, col. 233-235 (ISSN 0776-3948).
 Humbert DE MARNIX DE SAINTE-ALDEGONDE, État présent de la noblesse belge, Annuaire 2009, première partie, pp. 90–91.
 André MERTENS, Louvain-en-Woluwe. Une aventure urbanistique, 2003.
 Luc VERPOEST, Lemaire, Raymond Marie, in:  Repertorium van de architectuur in België van 1830 tot heden, ed. Anne Van Loo, Antwerp, Mercatorfonds, 2003, pp. 393–394.
 Pierre LACONTE (ed.), La recherche de la qualité environnementale et urbaine. Le cas de Louvain-la-Neuve, Lyon, 2009.
 Jean-Marie LECHAT, Louvain-la-Neuve - Trente années d'histoires, Academia-L'Harmattan, Louvain-la-Neuve, 2016
 Claudine HOUBART, Raymond M. Lemaire (1921-1997) et la conservation de la ville ancienne: approche historique et critique de ses projets belges dans une perspective internationale, doctoral thesis (unpublished), KU Leuven, 2015.

External links
 Raymond Lemaire on ODIS
 Raymond Lemaire on Dictionary of Art Historians

KU Leuven
Academic staff of KU Leuven
Academic staff of the Université catholique de Louvain
Catholic University of Leuven (1834–1968) alumni
Academic staff of the Catholic University of Leuven (1834–1968)
Belgian art historians
Belgian architects
Belgian conservationists
Belgian military personnel of World War II